The Pyongyang Peoples Outdoor Ice Rink (인민야외빙상장) is a new ice rink in Pyongyang. Despite the official name, the building is covered. It is larger than the 1982 Pyongyang Ice Rink (평양빙상관) on the bank of Pothonggang Canal.

References

Ice rinks
Sports venues in Pyongyang